A holographic weapon sight or holographic diffraction sight is a non-magnifying gunsight that allows the user to look through a glass optical window and see a holographic reticle image superimposed at a distance on the field of view. The hologram of the reticle is built into the window and is illuminated by a laser diode.

History

The first-generation holographic sight was introduced by EOTech—then an ERIM subsidiary—at the 1996 SHOT Show, under the trade name HoloSight by Bushnell (with whom the company was partnered with at the time), initially aiming for the civilian sport shooting and hunting market.  It won the Optic of the Year Award from the Shooting Industry Academy of Excellence.

EOTech was the only company that manufactured holographic sights until early 2017 (possibly January 2017), when Vortex introduced the Razor AMG UH-1 into the market as a competing product.

Design 

Holographic weapon sights use a laser transmission hologram of a reticle image that is recorded in three-dimensional space onto holographic film at the time of manufacture. This image is part of the optical viewing window. The recorded hologram is illuminated by the collimated light of a laser diode built into the sight. The sight can be adjusted for range and windage by simply tilting or pivoting the holographic grating. To compensate for any change in the laser wavelength due to temperature, the sight employs a holography grating that disperses the laser light by an equal amount but in the opposite direction as the hologram forming the aiming reticle.

The optical window in a holographic weapon sight looks like a piece of clear glass with an illuminated reticle in the middle. The aiming reticle can be an infinitely small dot whose perceived size is given by the acuity of the eye. For someone with 20/20 vision, it is about 1 minute of arc (0.3 mrad).

Holographic sights can be paired with "red dot magnifiers" to better engage farther targets.

Parallax error 
Like the reflector sight, the holographic sight is not "parallax free", having an aim-point that can move with eye position. This can be compensated for by having a holographic image that is set at a finite distance with parallax due to eye movement being the size of the optical window at close range and diminishing to zero at the set distance (usually around the target range of 100 yards).

Compared to reflector sights

Light transmission 
Since the reticle is a transmission hologram, illuminated by a laser shining through hologram presenting a reconstructed image, there is no need for the sight "window" to be partially blocked by a semi-silvered or dielectric dichroic coating needed to reflect an image such as in standard reflex sights. Holographic sights therefore have the potential for better light transmission than reflector sights.

Manufacturing costs 
Holographic sights are considerably more expensive than red dot sights, due to their complexity as well as there being only two manufacturers of holographic sights.

Size 
Holographic sights are generally bulkier than reflex sights and require a rifle to mount, while red dot sights have been made small enough to fit handguns.

Battery life 
Holographic sights have shorter battery life when compared to reflex sights that use LEDs, such as red dot sights. The laser diode in a holographic sight uses more power and has more complex driving electronics than a standard LED of an equivalent brightness, reducing the amount of time a holographic sight can run on a single set of batteries compared to a red dot sight (around 600 hours for typical holographic sights, compared to sometimes up to tens of thousands of hours for red dot sights). For example, the Vortex Razor AMG UH-1 holographic sight has been quoted as having an expected battery life of 1,000 to 1,500 hours (1½ to 2 months) on medium setting, while the Aimpoint CompM5s red dot sight has an expected battery life of around 8000 to  hours (1 to 5 years) depending on setting.

See also
 Fire-control system
 Collimator sight
 Reflex sight
 Laser sight (firearms)
 Prism sight, a type of telescopic sight
 Glossary of firearms terminology
 Glossary of military abbreviations
 List of laser articles

References

External links
 Red Dot Sights / Reflex Sights & Holosights Explained -Electronic Sights; A look at why they exist, how they work, and how you use them.

Firearm sights
Optical devices